James Parks "Buck" Cheves (November 29, 1898 – April 12, 1995) was a college football player and referee. Cheves was a Southeastern Conference official for 35 years.

Georgia Bulldogs
He led the "ten second backfield" of the 1920 Georgia Bulldogs led by first year coach Herman Stegeman which compiled an 8–0–1 record and won a Southern Intercollegiate Athletic Association (SIAA) title. It was the first Georgia squad to be known as the "Bulldogs." Cheves played without a helmet because he claimed the headgear impaired his hearing.  He returned a kick blocked by Puss Whelchel 87 yards for a touchdown to defeat Alabama, ranked fourth in The 50 Greatest Plays In Georgia Bulldogs Football History. He also starred in the backfield of 1919. Cheves was also a guard on the Georgia basketball team. Cheves was the captain of the 1921 basketball team that lost to Basil Hayden and the Kentucky Wildcats' "Wonder Team" in the SIAA championship game.
A ballad dedicated to Cheves appeared in the student newspaper the Red and Black:O! Cheves! O! Cheves!
In south, thou art rough,

The enemy grieves

When thou show'st thy stuff,

Thou art like a hurricane,

Thou hittest them hard,

God pity the man

Whom thou dost guard.

In 1945 he was president of the touchdown club of Atlanta. Cheves was inducted into the Georgia Sports Hall of Fame in 1976.

References

External links

1898 births
1995 deaths
American football quarterbacks
College football officials
Guards (basketball)
Georgia Bulldogs basketball players
Georgia Bulldogs football players
Players of American football from Georgia (U.S. state)
American men's basketball players